Gardone Val Trompia is a town and comune in the province of Brescia, in Lombardy, northern Italy. It is bounded by the comunes of Marcheno and Sarezzo. It is located in the Trompia valley. Gardone received the honorary title of city with a presidential decree on 21 September 2001.

Commerce
It is home to the major small arms manufacturers FAMARS and Fabbrica d'Armi Pietro Beretta. Among several regional makers of replica black powder firearms (such as A. Uberti, Srl., and Chiappa Firearms), the Davide Pedersoli company leads in production of over 75 types of historical black powder muzzle loading and breech loading firearms and is also known as the dominant brand in black powder shooting competitions worldwide.

Twin towns
Gardone Val Trompia is twinned with:
  Nanoro Department, Burkina Faso

People
 Bartolomeo Beretta (c. 1490 – c. 1565), founder of Beretta

References

Cities and towns in Lombardy